The Złote Kolce is an annual sports award in recognition of Polish competitors in the sport of athletics. Established in 1970 by Polish newspaper Sport and Polish Athletic Association, the award is decided by a complex points ranking system, which incorporates scores for performances in major national and international competitions, record-breaking performances, and end-of-year global rankings by World Athletics.

Winners

References

External links
Official Polish Athletics Association website 

Sport of athletics awards
Polish awards
Most valuable player awards
Awards established in 1970
1970 establishments in Poland